Geoffrey Ernest Duke  (29 March 1923 – 1 May 2015), born in St. Helens, Lancashire, was a British multiple motorcycle Grand Prix road racing world champion. He raced several brands of motorcycle: Norton, Gilera, BMW, NSU and Benelli. After retirement from competition, he was a businessman based in the Isle of Man.

Sporting career
After reaching the status of Team Sergeant in the Royal Signals Motorcycle Display Team, The White Helmets, Duke was a prominent figure in racing in the 1950s, winning six world championships and six Isle of Man TT races. First entering the Isle of Man Manx Grand Prix in 1948, he retired after four laps of the Junior race. He came to prominence after the 1949 events, finishing second in the Junior race, after remounting due to a spill, and winning the Senior race with a record lap and race-average speeds. He also won the 1949 Senior Clubmans TT. He signed to the Norton works team for the 1950 TT, finishing second in the Junior TT and breaking both lap and race records in the Senior TT.

After winning three World Championships for Norton, he moved abroad to Italian motorcycle manufacturer, Gilera in 1953. With Gilera, he had a string of three consecutive 500 cc world championships. His support for a riders' strike demanding more start money led the FIM to suspend him for six months, dashing any hopes for a fourth consecutive title. For 1953 he joined the sports car racing team of Aston Martin (Feltham, Middlesex) to race the DB3. Teamed with Peter Collins, the pair led the 12 Hours of Sebring until Duke's accident and resulting DNF. In 1955 he was declared the first rider to lap the Isle of Man TT course at 100 mph, though this was later corrected to 99.97. As a consequence the official first 100 mph lap is credited to Bob McIntyre, also on a Gilera, in 1957. Duke was a non-starter because of injury. His final race was the 1959 Nations Grand Prix.

Duke briefly dabbled in Formula One, entering the 1961 German Grand Prix in a private Cooper-Climax. Although forced to withdraw from that event as his car was not yet ready, he did race in the non-championship Kanonloppet at Karlskoga two weeks later.

In 1963, he formed a racing team – Scuderia Duke, with riders Derek Minter and John Hartle – to race the 1957 Gileras against Mike Hailwood riding the MV Agusta.

During 1964, Duke was appointed Competition Manager for Royal Enfield motorcycles, helping to develop their new GP250 clubman's-category production-volume road racer.

For the 1965 International Six Days Trial held on the Isle of Man, Duke was instrumental in helping to devise the 1,000-mile course and sections held on an island measuring approximately 30 miles long by 10 miles wide, particularly using tracks which would be unavailable in mainland UK due to restrictive legislation, a problem which did not arise on self-governing Isle of Man. Additionally, the island had hotels easily able to cater for the visiting teams, followers and spectators with a traditional goodwill and enthusiasm towards motorcycle sport. Duke acted as Clerk of the Course to the ACU, the governing body of motorcycle sport in Great Britain including the Isle of Man, which interacted with the FIM international organisation.

In 1967, Duke acted as entrant for the class-winning Triumph Bonneville ridden by John Hartle in the 750 cc capacity section of the newly introduced for 1967 Production class, which required racing machines to be based on roadsters, complying with controlled specifications using selected adaptations only, available from the manufacturers as part-numbered inventory.

Personal life
Duke was the most famous rider to adopt one-piece leathers - he had enlisted his local tailor, Frank Barker, to make the first of his now famous one-piece race suits. Duke had previously used a one-piece lining under his two-piece leather racing suit, to facilitate easy movement, for which he received "ribald remarks from my team-mates!" He was named Sportsman of the Year in 1951, and was awarded the RAC Segrave Trophy.

Duke was appointed Officer of the Order of the British Empire (OBE) in the 1953 New Year Honours "for services to British Motor-Cycle racing."

He was one of many signatories in a letter to The Times on 17 July 1958 opposing 'the policy of apartheid' in international sport and defending 'the principle of racial equality which is embodied in the Declaration of the Olympic Games'.

After retiring from racing, Duke became a businessman, initially in the motor trade and later in shipping services to the Isle of Man. In 1978, he was instrumental in setting up the Manx Line that introduced the first roll-on-roll-off ferry service to the island in competition with the 150-year-old Isle of Man Steam Packet Company The FIM named him a Grand Prix "Legend" in 2002.

Highly honoured by the Isle of Man, where he made so many of his world record breaking rides, a point on the mountain section of the TT Course was named after him in 2003. Three sharp bends at the 32nd Milestone between Brandywell and Windy Corner now carry the title 'Duke's'.

He died, aged 92, at his home on the Isle of Man on 1 May 2015 after being ill for some time. Duke's funeral cortege assembled at TT Grandstand, Glencrutchery Road, Douglas, Isle of Man on 10 May, prior to a last lap of the Snaefell Mountain Course, followed by a private family funeral service.

World Championship results

(key) (Races in bold indicate pole position; races in italics indicate fastest lap. An empty black cell indicates that the class did not compete at that particular championship round.)

See also
 Duke Road Racing Rankings

References

Footnotes

All Grand Prix results are taken from Walker, pp. 248–252

Books

Sportspeople from St Helens, Merseyside
British motorcycle racers
English motorcycle racers
500cc World Championship riders
350cc World Championship riders
250cc World Championship riders
Isle of Man TT riders
Motorcycle racing team owners
Officers of the Order of the British Empire
Segrave Trophy recipients
1923 births
2015 deaths
500cc World Riders' Champions
350cc World Riders' Champions